Zatoka is the Polish and Ukrainian word for bay. It may refer to:
 Zatoka, Lesser Poland Voivodeship, in Poland
 Zatoka, Odessa Oblast, in Ukraine
 Zatoka Leśna, in northern Poland